Brotterode is a town and a former municipality next to the Rennsteig in the Thuringian Forest, in the Schmalkalden-Meiningen district, in Thuringia, central Germany.  Since 1 December 2011, it is part of the town Brotterode-Trusetal. It is situated 11 km north of Schmalkalden, and 19 km southeast of Eisenach.

History

Brotterode was first mentioned in 1039 under the name of "Brunuwardesrot". In the Middle Ages (around 1360) it was the residence of a Vogt. In 1583 it became a possession of the Landgrave of Hesse. Before World War II, was part of the Prussian province of Hesse-Nassau.

In 1895, the Great Fire of Brotterode almost completely destroyed the village. 729 out of 842 buildings were burned down, but the village was gradually rebuilt in the following years. In 1936 Brotterode obtained city rights.

Today Brotterode is famous for tourism, winter sports, and hiking.

Main sights

Next to Brotterode is the Großer Inselsberg which is, with 916.5 meters, one of the highest mountains in the Thuringian Forest.

Named after it is the ski jumping hill Inselbergschanze with a current record of 123.5 meters.

International relations

Brotterode is twinned with:
  Bad Vilbel, Germany
  Saint-Martin-le-Vinoux, France

References

External links
 Official website 
 Inselbergbad Brotterode 
 Nordic Walking Zentrum Brotterode 

Towns in Thuringia
Former municipalities in Thuringia